Tazewell is both a surname and a masculine given name. Notable people with the name include:

Surname:
Charles Tazewell (1900–1972), American writer
 Henry Tazewell (1753–1799), American politician
 Littleton Waller Tazewell (1774–1860), American politician
Paul Tazewell, American costume designer

Given name:
Tazewell Ellett (1856–1914), American politician
Tazewell B. Tanner (1821-1881), American politician
Tazewell Thompson (born 1948), American playwright and theater director

Masculine given names
English-language surnames
English masculine given names